Alex Surprenant (born September 4, 1989) is a Canadian soccer player currently unattached.

Career

Youth
Born in Saint-Alexandre, Quebec, Surprenant began playing soccer with Lakers du Lac Saint-Louis in the Ligue de Soccer Elite Quebec, where he was named Best Defender, and won a gold medal at the Canadian Club Championships in 2006.

Professional
Surprenant was signed by new expansion franchise Trois-Rivières Attak for the 2007 CSL season. He helped Attak to claim their first piece of silverware by claiming the Open Canada Cup, and finished as runner-up in the National Division, before losing to the Serbian White Eagles in the CSL Championship Game.

Surprenant signed with the Montreal Impact of the USL First Division in 2008. He made his debut on May 14, 2008, against the Charleston Battery, and scored his first Impact goal on September 8, 2008, against Minnesota Thunder. Surprenant also helped the Impact claim the inaugural Canadian Championship, which gained Montreal entry into the qualifying round of the CONCACAF Champions League 2008-09. In the playoffs, he helped the Impact make the semi-finals, where they were eliminated by eventual winners, the Vancouver Whitecaps FC.

Surprenant signed with FC Edmonton of the North American Soccer League on March 3, 2011. The club released Surprenant on October 12, 2011.

References

External links
 Montreal Impact bio
 

1989 births
Living people
Association football defenders
Canadian Soccer League (1998–present) players
Canadian soccer players
FC Edmonton players
French Quebecers
Montreal Impact (1992–2011) players
People from Montérégie
Soccer people from Quebec
Trois-Rivières Attak players
USL First Division players
North American Soccer League players
Canada men's youth international soccer players
2009 CONCACAF U-20 Championship players
Lakers du Lac Saint-Louis players